Matheson station is located in the township of Black River-Matheson in Ontario, Canada.

History
An original station was built on the line circa 1908 by the Temiskaming and Northern Ontario Railway; it was destroyed in the Matheson Fire in 1916. The present brick structure was built in its place in 1916. It still remains in place (as of 2020), well-maintained, unused and in good condition. The building contains a cornerstone indicating it was placed in 1916 by William Howard Hearst as Premier of Ontario, T.&N.O Railway Chairman Jacob Lewis Englehart, Denis Murphy and George Wise.

It was a stop for Northlander trains that are owned by Ontario Northland.  The station was also a transfer point between the rail service and the  Ontario Northland Motor Coach Services to Timmins, South Porcupine and  Iroquois Falls.

In 2021 the Government of Ontario announced plans to restore service using ONR from this station north to either Timminis or Cochrane by the mid 2020s.

References

External links
ONR – Matheson Station

Ontario Northland Railway stations
Railway stations in Cochrane District
Disused railway stations in Canada